A chemical database is a database specifically designed to store chemical information. This information is about chemical and crystal structures, spectra, reactions and syntheses, and thermophysical data.

Types of chemical databases

Bioactivity database 

Bioactivity databases correlate structures or other chemical information to bioactivity results taken from bioassays in literature, patents, and screening programs.

Chemical structures 
Chemical structures are traditionally represented using lines indicating chemical bonds between atoms and drawn on paper (2D structural formulae). While these are ideal visual representations for the chemist, they are unsuitable for computational use and especially for search and storage. Small molecules (also called ligands in drug design applications), are usually represented using lists of atoms and their connections. Large molecules such as proteins are however more compactly represented using the sequences of their amino acid building blocks.
Large chemical databases for structures are expected to handle the storage and searching of information on millions of molecules taking terabytes of physical memory.

Literature database 

Chemical literature databases correlate structures or other chemical information to relevant references such as academic papers or patents. This type of database includes STN, Scifinder, and Reaxys. Links to literature are also included in many databases that focus on chemical characterization.

Crystallographic database 

Crystallographic databases store X-ray crystal structure data.  Common examples include Protein Data Bank and Cambridge Structural Database.

NMR spectra database 

NMR spectra databases correlate chemical structure with NMR data.  These databases often include other characterization data such as FTIR and mass spectrometry.

Reactions database 

Most chemical databases store information on stable molecules but in databases for reactions also intermediates and temporarily created unstable molecules are stored. Reaction databases contain information about products, educts, and reaction mechanisms.

Thermophysical database 

Thermophysical data are information about
 phase equilibria including vapor–liquid equilibrium, solubility of gases in liquids, liquids in solids (SLE), heats of mixing, vaporization, and fusion.
 caloric data like heat capacity, heat of formation and combustion,
 transport properties like viscosity and thermal conductivity

Chemical structure representation 

There are two principal techniques for representing chemical structures in digital databases

 As connection tables / adjacency matrices / lists with additional information on bond (edges) and atom attributes (nodes), such as:
MDL Molfile, PDB, CML
 As a linear string notation based on depth first or breadth first traversal, such as:
SMILES/SMARTS, SLN, WLN, InChI

These approaches have been refined to allow representation of stereochemical differences and charges as well as special kinds of bonding such as those seen in organo-metallic compounds.  The principal advantage of a computer representation is the possibility for increased storage and fast, flexible search.

Search

Substructure 
Chemists can search databases using parts of structures, parts of their IUPAC names as well as based on constraints on properties. Chemical databases are particularly different from other general purpose databases in their support for sub-structure search. This kind of search is achieved by looking for subgraph isomorphism (sometimes also called a monomorphism) and is a widely studied application of Graph theory.  The algorithms for searching are computationally intensive, often of O (n3) or O (n4) time complexity (where n is the number of atoms involved). The intensive component of search is called atom-by-atom-searching (ABAS), in which a mapping of the search substructure atoms and bonds with the target molecule is sought. ABAS searching usually makes use of the Ullman algorithm or variations of it (i.e. SMSD ). Speedups are achieved by time amortization, that is, some of the time on search tasks are saved by using precomputed information. This pre-computation typically involves creation of bitstrings representing presence or absence of molecular fragments. By looking at the fragments present in a search structure it is possible to eliminate the need for ABAS comparison with target molecules that do not possess the fragments that are present in the search structure. This elimination is called screening (not to be confused with the screening procedures used in drug-discovery). The bit-strings used for these applications are also called structural-keys. The performance of such keys depends on the choice of the fragments used for constructing the keys and the probability of their presence in the database molecules. Another kind of key makes use of hash-codes based on fragments derived computationally. These are called 'fingerprints' although the term is sometimes used synonymously with structural-keys. The amount of memory needed to store these structural-keys and fingerprints can be reduced by 'folding', which is achieved by combining parts of the key using bitwise-operations and thereby reducing the overall length.

Conformation
Search by matching 3D conformation of molecules or by specifying spatial constraints is another feature that is particularly of use in drug design. Searches of this kind can be computationally very expensive. Many approximate methods have been proposed, for instance BCUTS, special function representations, moments of inertia, ray-tracing histograms, maximum distance histograms, shape multipoles to name a few.

Giga Search
Databases of synthesizable and virtual chemicals are getting larger each year, therefore the ability to efficiently mine them is critical for drug discovery projects. MolSoft's MolCart Giga Search (http://www.molsoft.com/giga-search.html) is the first ever method designed for substructure search of billions of chemicals.

Descriptors
All properties of molecules beyond their structure can be split up into either physico-chemical or pharmacological attributes also called descriptors. On top of that, there exist various artificial and more or less standardized naming systems for molecules that supply more or less ambiguous names and synonyms. The IUPAC name is usually a good choice for representing a molecule's structure in a both human-readable and unique string although it becomes unwieldy for larger molecules. Trivial names on the other hand abound with homonyms and synonyms and are therefore a bad choice as a defining database key. While physico-chemical descriptors like molecular weight, (partial) charge, solubility, etc. can mostly be computed directly based on the molecule's structure, pharmacological descriptors can be derived only indirectly using involved multivariate statistics or experimental (screening, bioassay) results. All of those descriptors can for reasons of computational effort be stored along with the molecule's representation and usually are.

Similarity 

There is no single definition of molecular similarity, however the concept may be defined according to the application and is often described as an inverse of a measure of distance in descriptor space. Two molecules might be considered more similar for instance if their difference in molecular weights is lower than when compared with others. A variety of other measures could be combined to produce a multi-variate distance measure. Distance measures are often classified into Euclidean measures and non-Euclidean measures depending on whether the triangle inequality holds. Maximum Common Subgraph (MCS) based substructure search (similarity or distance measure) is also very common. MCS is also used for screening drug like compounds by hitting molecules, which share common subgraph (substructure).

Chemicals in the databases may be clustered into groups of 'similar' molecules based on similarities. Both hierarchical and non-hierarchical clustering approaches can be applied to chemical entities with multiple attributes. These attributes or molecular properties may either be determined empirically or computationally derived descriptors. One of the most popular clustering approaches is the Jarvis-Patrick algorithm .

In pharmacologically oriented chemical repositories, similarity is usually defined in terms of the biological effects of compounds (ADME/tox) that can in turn be semiautomatically inferred from similar combinations of physico-chemical descriptors using QSAR methods.

Registration systems 
Databases systems for maintaining unique records on chemical compounds are termed as Registration systems. These are often used for chemical indexing, patent systems and industrial databases.

Registration systems usually enforce uniqueness of the chemical represented in the database through the use of unique representations. By applying rules of precedence for the generation of stringified notations, one can obtain unique/'canonical' string representations such as 'canonical SMILES'. Some registration systems such as the CAS system make use of algorithms to generate unique hash codes to achieve the same objective.

A key difference between a registration system and a simple chemical database is the ability to accurately represent that which is known, unknown, and partially known.  For example, a chemical database might store a molecule with stereochemistry unspecified, whereas a chemical registry system requires the registrar to specify whether the stereo configuration is unknown, a specific (known) mixture, or racemic.  Each of these would be considered a different record in a chemical registry system.

Registration systems also preprocess molecules to avoid considering trivial differences such as differences in halogen ions in chemicals.

An example is the Chemical Abstracts Service (CAS) registration system. See also CAS registry number.

List of Chemical Cartridges 
 Accord 
 Direct 
 J Chem 
 CambridgeSoft 
 Bingo 
 Pinpoint

List of Chemical Registration Systems 
 ChemReg 
 Register
 RegMol 
 Compound-Registration 
 Ensemble

Web-based

Tools 

The computational representations are usually made transparent to chemists by graphical display of the data. Data entry is also simplified through the use of chemical structure editors. These editors internally convert the graphical data into computational representations.

There are also numerous algorithms for the interconversion of various formats of representation. An open-source utility for conversion is OpenBabel. These search and conversion algorithms are implemented either within the database system itself or as is now the trend is implemented as external components that fit into standard relational database systems. Both Oracle and PostgreSQL based systems make use of cartridge technology that allows user defined datatypes. These allow the user to make SQL queries with chemical search conditions (For example, a query to search for records having a phenyl ring in their structure represented as a SMILES string in a SMILESCOL column could be

 SELECT * FROM CHEMTABLE WHERE SMILESCOL.CONTAINS('c1ccccc1')

Algorithms for the conversion of IUPAC names to structure representations and vice versa are also used for extracting structural information from text. However, there are difficulties due to the existence of multiple dialects of IUPAC. Work is on to establish a unique IUPAC standard (See InChI).

See also 
 Biological database
 Beilstein database and Dortmund Data Bank
 BindingDB
 ChEBI
 ChEMBL
 Chemisches Zentralblatt Structural Database
 ChemSpider
 Collaborative Drug Discovery
 Comparative Toxicogenomics Database
 Computational Chemistry List
 DrugBank
 List of chemical databases
 List of software for molecular mechanics modeling
 LOLI Database
 NMR spectra database
 PubChem
 SPRESI database
 Colocalization Benchmark Source

References 

Computational chemistry
 
Cheminformatics